Drachten Airfield (Dutch: Vliegveld Drachten)  is a small general aviation airfield in the Netherlands located in the province of Friesland,  northeast of Drachten. Customs services are available upon request to allow international flights.

The airfield was constructed in the 1950s by the Philips electronics company, which has a factory in Drachten. In an attempt to provide an avenue for otherwise illegal street races, the airfield is now also used for drag racing.

References

External links
Airliners.net - Photos taken at Drachten airfield
 

Airports in Friesland
Smallingerland